Thirteen Lives is a 2022 biographical survival film based on the Tham Luang cave rescue directed and produced by Ron Howard, from a screenplay written by William Nicholson. The film stars Viggo Mortensen, Colin Farrell, Joel Edgerton, and Tom Bateman.

Thirteen Lives was released in select theaters on July 29, 2022, by United Artists Releasing, and began streaming on Prime Video on August 5, 2022. The film received generally positive reviews from critics.

Plot
On June 23, 2018, twelve boys of the junior football team "Wild Boars" and their assistant coach Ekkaphon Chanthawong leave practice to explore the Tham Luang cave. When the team fails to arrive at a birthday party organised by their parents, their families head to the caves, only to find them flooded and the boys missing, their bikes left at the entrance. The parents immediately alert emergency services.

Royal Thai Navy SEALs, led by Captain Arnont, arrive to search for the missing boys, but find the dive too difficult to locate the team. Vernon Unsworth, a local British caver, shares his extensive knowledge of the complex and dangerous cave and suggests the authorities get in touch with the British Cave Rescue Council. British cavers Rick Stanton and John Volanthen travel to Thailand and attempt the dive, finding the boys and coach four kilometres from the entrance. During an attempt to deliver air tanks to the boys to keep them alive in preparation for the rescue, former Thai Navy Seal Saman Kunan drowns.

Meanwhile, as hundreds of volunteers try to mitigate poor weather conditions, a water technician from Bangkok gains the permission of local farmers to divert water from the mountain onto their fields, destroying their crop.

Realising the boys will have to be removed through the cave, via a 6-hour dive, Stanton and Volanthen contact Dr. Richard Harris, plus supporting divers Chris Jewell and Jason Mallinson.  With permission from the regional governor and minister, the divers sedate the boys and, with one diver per boy, carry each member out of the cave safely. The coach is removed last. Removed to hospital, the parents are reunited with the team. The end scene is the boys celebrating the birthday party that was supposed to happen on the day they went into the cave. The end credits reveal that the coach and three of the boys, who were all stateless, are given Thai citizenship. The film is dedicated to Saman Kunan, the Thai Navy Seal who died on July 6, 2018 during the rescue operation, and Beirut Pakbara, a Thai Navy Seal who later died from a blood infection.

Cast
 Viggo Mortensen as Richard Stanton
 Colin Farrell as John Volanthen
 Joel Edgerton as Richard Harris
 Tom Bateman as Chris Jewell
 Pattarakorn Tangsupakul as Buahom 
 Sukollawat Kanarot as Saman Kunan
 Teerapat Sajakul as Captain Anand
 Sahajak Boonthanakit as Governor Narongsak Osatanakorn
 Vithaya Pansringarm as General Anupong Paochinda
 Teeradon Supapunpinyo as Ekkaphon Chanthawong
 Nophand Boonyai as Thanet Natisri
 Paul Gleeson as Jason Mallinson
 Lewis Fitz-Gerald as Vernon Unsworth
 Peter Knight as Police Captain Bas
 U Gambira as Kruba Boonchum
 Josh Helman as Major Hodges

Production

It had been announced in April 2020 that Ron Howard was to direct the film, with William Nicholson writing the screenplay. Metro-Goldwyn-Mayer would acquire the rights to the film the next month. In March 2021, Viggo Mortensen, Colin Farrell and Joel Edgerton were among the cast announced to star in the film. Filming began on March 29, 2021, in Australia. It was also shot in Thailand. The film's original score was composed by Benjamin Wallfisch.

Release
Thirteen Lives was released by United Artists Releasing in select theaters on July 29, 2022, before streaming on Amazon Prime Video on August 5. The film was originally scheduled for a fully theatrical release by United Artists Releasing on April 15, 2022, and was then postponed to November 18 in response to the best test scores in MGM's history. In May 2022, however, the film was brought to its current release date due to Amazon's acquisition of MGM in March.

Music
When Howard approached his usual collaborator Hans Zimmer for the score, the latter strongly recommended his protege Benjamin Wallfisch for the job.  Wallfisch had a 20-minute suite ready before Howard had started shooting in Thailand.

Reception
On the review aggregator website Rotten Tomatoes, the film has an approval rating of 86% based on 178 reviews, with an average rating of 7.3/10. The website's consensus reads, "Steadily helmed by director Ron Howard, Thirteen Lives offers an incomplete but still gripping dramatization of an incredible true story." On Metacritic, the film has a weighted average score of 66 out of 100 based on 40 critics, indicating "generally favorable reviews".

Accolades

References

Notes

External links
 
 Official screenplay

2022 films
2022 biographical drama films
Films directed by Ron Howard
Films produced by Brian Grazer
Films scored by Benjamin Wallfisch
Films with screenplays by William Nicholson
Films shot in Australia
Films shot in Thailand
Drama films based on actual events
Imagine Entertainment films
Metro-Goldwyn-Mayer films
American biographical drama films
British biographical drama films
Canadian biographical drama films
Tham Luang cave rescue
Films set in 2018
2020s English-language films
English-language Canadian films